Uaithne Ó Cobhthaigh (murdered 1556) was an Irish poet.

Biography

Ó Cobhthaigh was a member of a hereditary bardic family based in what is now County Westmeath. His father's name was William.

The Oxford Dictionary of National Biography states that "he was murdered, with his wife, at Ballinlig, Westmeath."

Verse

At least two of his poems still exist: ""/"Greater than an earl is the name of James", and the theological poem, ""/"Long be this remembrance on the justice of God", which consists of one hundred and sixty verses.

See also

 Aedh Ó Cobhthaigh, died 1452. 
 Murchadh Bacagh Ó Cobhthaigh, died 1478.
 Tadhg Ó Cobhthaigh, died 1556.

References

16th-century Irish writers
People from County Westmeath
Irish-language poets
Irish murder victims
People murdered in Ireland
Unsolved murders in Ireland
1536 deaths
Year of birth unknown